Bongripper is an American doom metal band from Chicago, Illinois, United States.

History
In 2006 Bongripper self-released their first album titled The Great Barrier Reefer, which is composed of a single 79-minute piece created with the intention of being longer than Sleep's Dopesmoker. In 2007, the band self-released their second studio album titled Hippie Killer and their third studio album titled Heroin. In 2008, the band self-released its fourth studio album titled Hate Ashbury and a collaborative EP with Winters in Osaka.  This was followed by the band self-releasing their album Satan Worshipping Doom in 2010.

In 2013, Bongripper released two split EPs via Great Barrier Records; one with Hate and another one with Conan.

In 2014, the band released their sixth studio album titled Miserable via Great Barrier Records.

Their seventh album titled Terminal was released on July 6, 2018.

In May 2020, the band released Glaciers, an EP recorded in 2009 and left unreleased for 11 years.

Band members
Ronald Petzke - bass
Daniel O'Connor - drums
Nick Dellacroce - guitars
Dennis Pleckham - guitars

Discography

Studio albums
The Great Barrier Reefer (2006, self-released)
Track listing

Hippie Killer (2007, self-released)
Track listing

Heroin (2007, self-released)
Track listing

Hate Ashbury (2008, self-released)

Satan Worshipping Doom (2010, self-released) 
Track listing

Miserable (2014, The Great Barrier Records)
Track listing

Terminal (2018, The Great Barrier Records)
Track listing

EPs and splits
Meat Ditch  (2008, self-released)
Sex Tape / Snuff Film (2011, Great Barrier Records)
Bongripper/Hate (2013, Great Barrier Records)
Bongripper/Conan (2013, Holy Roar Records)
Glaciers (2020, self-released)

References

American doom metal musical groups
Musical groups from Chicago
Musical groups established in 2005